Youssef Maziz (born 24 June 1998) is a French professional footballer who plays as a midfielder for Ligue 2 club Metz.

Club career
Maziz made his professional debut for Metz in a 5–0 Ligue 1 loss against Lyon on 26 February 2017.

On 26 June 2019, he agreed to join Le Mans, newly promoted to Ligue 2, on loan from Metz.

International career
Born in France, Maziz is of Moroccan descent. He is a former youth international for France.

References

External links
 
 
 
 
 

Living people
1998 births
People from Thionville
Sportspeople from Moselle (department)
Association football midfielders
French footballers
France youth international footballers
Thionville FC players
FC Metz players
CSO Amnéville players
US Avranches players
Le Mans FC players
R.F.C. Seraing (1922) players
Ligue 1 players
Ligue 2 players
Championnat National players
Championnat National 2 players
Championnat National 3 players
Belgian Pro League players
French sportspeople of Moroccan descent
French expatriate footballers
French expatriate sportspeople in Belgium
Expatriate footballers in Belgium
Footballers from Grand Est